Leonor Rita Acevedo Suárez (Buenos Aires, May 22, 1876–Buenos Aires, July 8, 1975) was the mother of the Argentine author Jorge Luis Borges, and a major figure in his life and work.

All about her life

Leonor Rita Acevedo Suárez was born in Argentina, the daughter of Isidoro Acevedo Laprida (1828-?) and Leonor Suárez Haedo de Acevedo (1837–1918). She married Jorge Guillermo Borges, a lawyer with literary aspirations, by whom she had two children: Jorge Luis and Norah. As her husband's sight deteriorated, she assisted him with his reading and dictation, services which she would later provide to her son as he succumbed to the same hereditary blindness.

She produced several translations from English and French. Her output includes "The Woman Who Rode Away" by D. H. Lawrence, The Human Comedy by William Saroyan and Faulkner's If I Forget Thee, Jerusalem, among other works.

Leonor was known for her forceful personality and vitality. Tomás Eloy Martínez writes that when Borges visited the University of Texas in Austin in 1961, his mother was eighty-five but appeared much younger; as she walked about on her son's arm, many students assumed she was the author's wife.

Death
Leonor Acevedo Suárez died in 1975, aged 99. At her wake, a woman paid her respects and remarked, "Poor little Leonor, to die so close to turning a hundred. If only she'd waited a little longer..." to which Borges replied, "I see, madam, that you're a devotee of the decimal system."

Notes

References
 Borges, Jorge Luis; Ferrari, Osvaldo. En diálogo / I. Mexico: siglo xxi, 2005;  Googlebooks

1876 births
1975 deaths
People from Buenos Aires
Jorge Luis Borges
Argentine translators
English–Spanish translators
French–Spanish translators
Portuguese–Spanish translators
Argentine writers in French
Burials at La Recoleta Cemetery
Argentine people of Spanish descent
Uruguayan emigrants to Argentina
Argentine Roman Catholics
Patrician families of Buenos Aires